Eunomia insularis is a moth in the subfamily Arctiinae first described by Augustus Radcliffe Grote in 1866. It is found on Cuba.

References

Moths described in 1881
Arctiinae
Endemic fauna of Cuba